The 3rd Academy Awards were held on November 5, 1930 by the Academy of Motion Picture Arts and Sciences (AMPAS), awarding films released between August 1, 1929 and July 31, 1930. AMPAS decided to hold the awards in November to move them closer to the eligibility period; therefore, the ceremony took place only seven months after the 2nd Academy Awards, making 1930 the only year in which two Academy Awards ceremonies were held.

All Quiet on the Western Front became the first film to win both Best Picture and Best Director, which would become common in later years. Lewis Milestone became the first person to win two Oscars, having won Best Director – Comedy at the 1st Academy Awards. The Love Parade received six nominations, the greatest number of any film to that point, but did not win in any category.

Best Sound Recording was introduced this year, making it the first new category since the inception of the Oscars. It was awarded to Douglas Shearer, brother of Best Actress winner Norma Shearer, making them the first sibling winners in Oscar history.

A portion of the awards were filmed for the first time: Universal Pictures co-founder and president Carl Laemmle receiving a special Academy Award for All Quiet on the Western Front, given to him by Louis B. Mayer, vice president of Metro-Goldwyn-Mayer; Norma Shearer winning Best Actress for The Divorcee, and screenwriter Frances Marion winning Best Writing for The Big House.

Winners and nominees

Nominees were announced on September 19, 1930. Winners are listed first and highlighted in boldface.

Multiple nominations and awards 

The following eight films received multiple nominations:

 6 nominations: The Love Parade
 4 nominations: All Quiet on the Western Front, The Big House and The Divorcee
 3 nominations: Disraeli and Anna Christie
 2 nominations: Bulldog Drummond and Romance

The following two films received multiple awards:

 2 awards: All Quiet on the Western Front and The Big House

See also 

 1929 in film
 1930 in film

References

Academy Awards ceremonies
1929 film awards
1930 film awards
1930 in American cinema
Academy Awards
November 1930 events